Inflo Films is a Toronto-based independent film production company, founded in 2004 by Dusty Mancinelli and Harry Cherniak. 

In 2006, Inflo Films produced the short comedy Death to Charlie! In 2007, it released the quirky satire P.U.R.E., which has won several awards and has played at more than a dozen film festivals across the U.S. and Canada including the Cinéfest Sudbury International Film Festival, the Whistler Film Festival and the Washington DC Independent Film Festival. In 2009, its most recent short film, Soap, premiered at the Toronto International Film Festival and was sold to the Canadian Broadcasting Corporation.

References

External links
 Inflo Films Website
 Toronto International Film Festival Page for Soap
 National Post Interview

Companies based in Toronto
Canadian companies established in 2004
Film production companies of Canada
Mass media companies established in 2004